The Richmond Group is a geologic group in Michigan. It preserves fossils dating back to the Ordovician period.

In 1951, E. B. Branson, Mehl and C.C. Branson published an article about the Richmond Group conodonts of Kentucky and Indiana.

References

 

Geologic groups of Michigan